Chainat Hornbill Football Club (Thai สโมสรฟุตบอลชัยนาท ฮอร์นบิล) is a Thai professional association football  club based in Chai Nat province. The club plays in Thai League 2.

History

Foundation

Chainat Hornbill Football Club is a professional football club founded in 2009 by Anucha Nakasai, a former Thai politician. The club was placed in the best management class as a result, and it has developed rapidly since its first season. In the 2009 Northern Regional Division 2 Regional League the club came third, playing 20 matches and winning 12, drawing 3 and losing 5 for a total of 39 points. Their top scorer was Sanogo Abou, with 15 goals. In 2012, the club was promoted to the top league, Thai League 1, for the first time.

Amato era

In 2017, Anucha Nakasai announced the appointment of Dennis Amato as the new head coach of the club.

In October 2017, the club came first in Thai League 2 with 67 points and was promoted to Thai League 1.

After Chainat Hornbill's promotion to the top tier of Thai football, Amato briefly left the club to take up a role as a director of football at Ang Thong. The club announced the appointment of Drago Mamić as the new head coach of the club but Mamić left the club for personal reasons. 
However, Amato return to Chainat again, but was faced with many problems, including a squad with a limited number of players,  and strict financial constraints.

A Thai League Survival Campaign: Giant-killing
In 2018, after a win against defending FA Cup champions Chiangrai United, the Hornbills defeated the defending Thai League 1 champions Buriram United 1-0 at the Chang Arena, which was the first time that Buriram United had failed to win a league game on their own home ground since the return of Bozidar Bandovic  as coach. In the 2018 season, the club became well-known as "giant-killing." (Thai: จอมล้มยักษ์). Under Amato's management, the Hornbills play a style of football based on maintaining possession, and trying to win the ball back after losing it, instead of regrouping into a defensive position.

In 2019, the Hornbills beat many Thai League 1 giants. In a home game at Khao Plong Stadium they beat Muangthong United 3-0, won against Bangkok United with a score of 21, and beat Buriram United 2-1.

Stadium and locations by season

Season by season record

P = Played
W = Games won
D = Games drawn
L = Games lost
F = Goals for
A = Goals against
Pts = Points
Pos = Final position
N/A = No answer

TL = Thai League 1

QR1 = First Qualifying Round
QR2 = Second Qualifying Round
QR3 = Third Qualifying Round
QR4 = Fourth Qualifying Round
RInt = Intermediate Round
R1 = Round 1
R2 = Round 2
R3 = Round 3

R4 = Round 4
R5 = Round 5
R6 = Round 6
GR = Group stage
QF = Quarter-finals
SF = Semi-finals
RU = Runners-up
S = Shared
W = Winners

Players

First team squad

Out on loan

Coaching staff

Coaches
Coaches by Years (2010–present)

  Issara Sritaro 
  Surachai Jaturapattarapong 
  Jadet Meelarp 
  Thawatchai Damrong-Ongtrakul 
  Issara Sritaro 
  Koichi Sugiyama 
  Dr. med. Björn Kliem 
  Dennis Amato 
  Drago Mamić 
  Dennis Amato 
  Ronald Boretti 
  Sumeth Yooto 
  Daniel Blanco 
  Sumeth Yooto 
  Pannarai Phansiri

Honours

Domestic competitions

League
Thai League 2:
Winner: 2017
Runner-up: 2011
Regional League Northern Division:
 Runner-up (1): 2010

Cups
FA Cup
Champions: 2016

References

External links
 

 
Chai Nat province
Association football clubs established in 2009
Football clubs in Thailand
2009 establishments in Thailand
Thai League 1 clubs